Carlton on Trent railway station served the village of Carlton-on-Trent, Nottinghamshire, England from 1852 to 1953 on the East Coast Main Line.

History 
The station was opened as Carlton on 15 July 1852 by the Great Northern Railway. 'On-trent' was added to its name on 1 March 1881. It closed to both passengers and goods traffic on 2 March 1953.

References

External links 

Disused railway stations in Nottinghamshire
Former Great Northern Railway stations
Railway stations in Great Britain opened in 1852
Railway stations in Great Britain closed in 1953
1850 establishments in England
1953 disestablishments in England